Nguyễn Bá Cẩn (9 September 1930, in Cần Thơ – 20 May 2009, in San Jose, California) was a South Vietnamese politician who served as Prime Minister of South Vietnam from 5 April 1975 until 28 April 1975; serving under Presidents Nguyễn Văn Thiệu (5 April to 21 April) and Trần Văn Hương (21 April to 28 April).

Early life and political career
He was born on September 9, 1930 in Cần Thơ, Cochinchina, French Indochina into a well-to-do peasant Catholic family. After graduating from college with a baccalaureate, he enlisted in the army to study in the First Course of the Thu Duc Reserve Officers Student in 1951. After graduating in 1953, he continued to register and pass the entrance exam to the National School of Administration in 1954 and graduated as valedictorian in administration in 1957.

Started his political career with the position of Chief of Cái Bè District, Định Tường (1958); Deputy Governor Định Tường (1959); Deputy Governor Phước Tuy (1962); then Deputy Governor of Long An Province (1964).

In 1967 during the Second Republic, he was elected to the National Assembly as a member of Định Tường province, then was appointed as the Second Vice Chairman of the House of Representatives. At the end of 1967, he cooperated with Congressman Đặng Văn Sung of the Alliance of Farmers and Engineers in the Senate to establish the Bicameral Social Democratic Union. In 1969, this bloc joined forces with Mr. Trần Quốc Bửu, Chairman of the Vietnam General Confederation of Workers, to establish the Vietnam Workers' Party, with Mr. Trần Quốc Bửu as Chairman, and he became General Secretary. During the second term (1971–1975) of the National Assembly, he was elected Speaker of the House of Representatives.

Prime Minister of South Vietnam (1975)
In March 1975, after the army of North Vietnam had taken control of most of the Central region and the highlands, under pressure from the United States, there was a need for a sweeping reform of the composition of the government to stabilize the country, internal affairs in the South and had enough strength to engage in dialogue with the Communists, President Nguyễn Văn Thiệu invited him to take the position of Prime Minister, replacing the incumbent Prime Minister Trần Thiện Khiêm who had just resigned.

On April 14, 1975, he presented the Cabinet list with the title "Government of National Unity" to President Thiệu. Mr. Cẩn heads a Cabinet that has many experts and politicians considered "strong" many times more than the previous Saigon cabinet.

 Prime Minister: Nguyễn Bá Cẩn
 Deputy Prime Minister: Dr. Nguyễn Văn Hảo cum Minister of Agriculture and Industry
 Deputy Prime Minister: Engineer Dương Kích Nhưỡng (in charge of Relief and Settlement)
 Deputy Prime Minister: Trần Văn Đôn (in charge of inspection) cum Minister of National Defense
 Foreign Minister: Lawyer Vương Văn Bắc
 Interior Minister: Bửu Viên
 Finance Minister: Lê Quang Trường
 Chief of Planning: Dr. Nguyễn Tiến Hưng
 Attorney General: Lawyer Ngô Khắc Tịnh
 Minister of Social Affairs: Professor Trần Văn Mãi
 Minister of Health: MP Tôn Thất Niệm
 Minister of Public Works and Traffic: Engineer Nguyễn Xuân Đức
 Minister of Culture: Professor Nguyễn Duy Xuân
 Minister of Information: Brigadier General Phan Hòa Hiệp
 Minister of the Prime Minister's Office: Nguyễn Long Châu
 Secretary of State: Lawyer Lê Trọng Quát , Professor Phạm Thái, Nguyễn Xuân Phong
And many other Ministers, Deputy Ministers, Advisors such as Judge Huỳnh Đức Bửu, Professor Nguyễn Thanh Liêm, Engineer Đoàn Minh Quan, Engineer Nguyền Hữu Tân, Nguyễn Quang Diệp.

However, just a week later, when the Battle of Xuân Lộc line was broken, on April 21, President Thiệu announced his resignation, ceding power to Vice President Trần Văn Hương. The government was on the verge of collapsing and on April 25, Prime Minister Nguyễn Bá Cẩn also submitted his resignation to the new president but was asked to handle the standings until a new prime minister was available.

The last hours of his ministry, he reported in an interview with journalist Hạnh Dương as follows:

"The Vietnam issue at that time was a joint game between the United States and the Soviet Union. They got involved and arranged everything. They forced us to surrender, to hand over the status quo. On April 21, 1975, President Nguyễn Văn Thiệu had to resign. According to the Constitution, he handed over the presidency to Vice President Trần Văn Hương. On April 25, 1975, I submitted my resignation as Prime Minister of the Republic of Vietnam, but President President Trần Văn Hương asked me to stay and continue handling the stand until April 28, 1975 to wait for the new government."

...

"On the morning of April 27, 1975, I attended an urgent and closed meeting with President Trần Văn Hương at the Vice President's residence to discuss the fact that the United States and France and were forcing the Saigon government to hand over South Vietnam to the communist regime. The Communists of North Vietnam demanded that the presidency should be handed over to General Dương Văn Minh, I told President Trần Văn Hương that if the President automatically hands over to General Minh, then thousands of generations of history will resent the President! If the National Assembly agrees to hand it over, the President will hand it over to Mr. Dương Văn Minh and thus the President will avoid unconstitutional actions."'''

..."The session ended at 12 noon. I had just returned to the Prime Minister's Palace at 12:15 when Ambassador Martin of the United States called to tell me, "The night of April 26, 1975, North Vietnamese Communists firing rockets at the center of Saigon was only a warning. Now the North Vietnamese Communists have already deployed 20 divisions around Saigon and the South Vietnamese are required to hand over the Presidency to Mr. Dương Văn Minh, anyone else cannot be accepted, and must hand over before 12 in the late hours of April 27, 1975, otherwise the North Vietnamese would bombard Saigon on the ground. So please, Prime Minister, please help Senate President Trần Văn Lắm to convene an emergency bicameral session of the National Assembly."..."I instructed Radio Saigon and the television programs to keep playing heroic music and for a few minutes to read the order to summon the Bicameral National Assembly urgently. Thanks to that, on the night of April 27, 1975, there were enough valid quorums. That is, a total of 60 MPS of the Senate and  159 MPs of the House met to decide whether to agree or not to hand over power to General Dương Văn Minh as requested by the North Vietnamese Communists, if not, Saigon will be attacked on an equal footing. The bicameral National Assembly voted to approve and on the afternoon of April 28, 1975, President Tran Van Huong handed over the position of President to former General Dương Văn Minh."
After President Trần Văn Hương resigned and gave the presidency to General Dương Văn Minh, former Foreign Minister Vũ Văn Mẫu was invited to hold the position of prime minister. Former Prime Minister Nguyễn Bá Cẩn officially resigns from office. However, the situation of the Republic of Vietnam is still irreversible. Only 2 days later, General Dương Văn Minh was forced to declare his surrender to the Provisional Revolutionary Government of the Republic of South Vietnam. The regime of the Republic of Vietnam completely collapsed.

Life in exile
After submitting his resignation, he arranged for his wife and youngest daughter  to board the last Air France flight to Paris on April 26. Only 2 days later, he was brought over the Philippines by the US Embassy on a C-130 plane of the US army. On this flight were also Hoàng Đức Nhã  and Phan Quang Đán, two veteran politicians. From the Philippines, US authorities took him to California. After he arrived in Sacramento, his wife and youngest daughter were also approved by the US government to immigrate to the United States from Paris to reunite.

After settling in northern California, he initially opened a small gas station in the city of Mountain View. However, after only 3 months, the business had to stop because of capital loss. Then, he enrolled to study computing at the age of 46. In 1979, he graduated as a programmer and joined Standard Oil, then Chevron Texaco Corp., working in the Computer Department until retiring in 1998.

In retirement, he devotes time to social activities and human rights. In September 2003, he published his memoirs My Country. In May 2009, he submitted the dossier "Vietnam's continental shelf" to the United Nations, affirming Vietnam's sovereignty over the East Sea and the Hoàng Sa and Trường Sa archipelagoes.

He died at 4:30 am on May 20, 2009 at Regional Medical Center, San Jose, California, United States.

See also
Politics of South Vietnam

References

1930 births
2009 deaths
South Vietnamese politicians
Members of the National Assembly (South Vietnam)
Prime Ministers of South Vietnam
Vietnamese emigrants to the United States
People from San Jose, California